The First League of the Republika Srpska 2005–06 was the 11th since its establishment.

League table

External links 
 FSRS official website.

Bos
2005–06 in Bosnia and Herzegovina football
First League of the Republika Srpska seasons